KXKQ (94.5 FM, "Kat Kountry 94") is a radio station licensed to serve Safford, Arizona, United States. The station is owned by Reed Richins, through licensee Double-R-Communications LLC. It airs a country music format. Home of "Reed in the Morning", hosted by Reed Richins. The top morning show in the Gila Valley for 25 years.

The station was assigned the KXKQ call letters by the Federal Communications Commission on March 13, 1979.

In 2000, KXKQ was named "Best Country Music Station" by the editors of the Phoenix New Times. In 2001, the same newspaper named KXKQ "Best Country Radio Station".

References

External links
 KXKQ official website
 

XKQ
Country radio stations in the United States
Mass media in Graham County, Arizona